Reyners may refer to:

 Jelle Reyners (1600–1634), Dutch Golden Age painter
 Martin Reyners, New Zealand geophysicist and seismologist
 Reyners v Belgium, a 1974 EU law case concerning the free movement of services in the European Union

See also
 Reyner, a surname